Stephanella is a genus of bryozoans belonging to the monotypic family Stephanellidae.

The species of this genus are found in Northern America.

Species:

Stephanella continentalis 
Stephanella hina 
Stephanella trichopterina

References

Phylactolaemata
Bryozoan genera